Jeff Sorrells (born 1959) is an American politician. He is a member of the Alabama House of Representatives from the 87th District, serving since 2019. He is a member of the Republican party. Sorrells was previously the mayor of Hartford, Alabama and is a vice president of the First National Bank of Hartford, Alabama.

References

Living people
1959 births
Republican Party members of the Alabama House of Representatives
21st-century American politicians